Che Jon Fernandes (born 22 July 1971) is a Paralympian athlete from Greece competing mainly in category F53-54 shot put events.

He competed in the 2008 Summer Paralympics in Beijing, China. There he won a bronze medal in the men's F53-54 shot put event.

External links
 

Paralympic athletes of Greece
Athletes (track and field) at the 2008 Summer Paralympics
Athletes (track and field) at the 2012 Summer Paralympics
Athletes (track and field) at the 2016 Summer Paralympics
Paralympic gold medalists for Greece
Paralympic bronze medalists for Greece
Greek people of Portuguese descent
Living people
1971 births
Medalists at the 2008 Summer Paralympics
Medalists at the 2016 Summer Paralympics
Paralympic medalists in athletics (track and field)
Athletes (track and field) at the 2020 Summer Paralympics
Greek male shot putters
21st-century Greek people
20th-century Greek people
Wheelchair shot putters
Paralympic shot putters